Igor Horbenko is a paralympic athlete from Ukraine competing mainly in category F12 long and triple jump events.

Igor has competed in three Paralympics, always competing in the long jump and triple jump.  He won a silver in the long jump in the 2000 Summer Paralympics and won two bronzes in the triple jump in 1996 and 2000

References

Paralympic athletes of Ukraine
Athletes (track and field) at the 1996 Summer Paralympics
Athletes (track and field) at the 2000 Summer Paralympics
Paralympic silver medalists for Ukraine
Paralympic bronze medalists for Ukraine
Ukrainian male long jumpers
Ukrainian male triple jumpers
Living people
Medalists at the 1996 Summer Paralympics
Medalists at the 2000 Summer Paralympics
Year of birth missing (living people)
Paralympic medalists in athletics (track and field)
Visually impaired long jumpers
Visually impaired triple jumpers
Paralympic long jumpers
Paralympic triple jumpers